Qatar-1 is an orange main sequence star in the constellation of Draco.

Star characteristics 
Qatar-1 has an average to high metallicity of 160% of solar, and is of similar age to Sun. The star has significant starspot activity.

Planetary system 
The "Hot Jupiter" class planet Qatar-1b was discovered around Qatar-1 in 2010. The planetary orbit is likely aligned with the rotational axis of the star, with the misalignment measurement based on the Rossiter-McLaughlin effect equal to −8.4 degrees. The planet has a large measured temperature difference between dayside (1696 K) and nightside (1098 K). A spectroscopic study in 2017 does suggest that Qatar-1b has relatively clear skies with a few clouds.

Additional planets or a brown dwarf in the system were suspected in 2013, but were refuted in 2015.

The transit-timing variation search in 2020 has also resulted in no detection of additional planets in the system, although by 2022 additional transit-timing variation data have suggested the planetary system is accelerating under influence of the unseen long-period companion.

References 

Planetary systems with one confirmed planet
Draco (constellation)
K-type main-sequence stars
Planetary transit variables